Forest Buffen Harkness Brown (1873–1954) was an American botanist known for his work on pteridophytes and spermatophytes.

Life and research 

Brown studied forestry, systematic botany, and ecology at the University of Michigan in 1902, receiving his master's degree in 1903. Early in his career, Brown studied plant distribution on the flood plain of the Huron River in Ypsilanti, Michigan.

He worked for the United States Forest Service before joining Ohio State University as professor of botany. Brown pursued further research on Hawaiian trees at Yale University for two years and received his Ph.D. in 1918. He married biologist Elizabeth Dorothy Wuist on August 20 of the same year, and the two of them performed two years of field work on the Bernice P. Bishop Museum Bayard Dominick Expedition to the Marquesas Islands (1921–1922), along with ethnologist Edward S. Handy and archeologist Ralph Lauton. Brown and his wife also visited the Tuamotu archipelago and New Zealand where they collected 9000 dried plant and 120 wood samples. In 1920, Brown was a research fellow at Yale when he became a staff botanist for the Bishop Museum in Honolulu, Hawaii. His wife joined him at the Bishop Museum as a research associate in cryptogamic botany.

Organizations 
Michigan Academy of Science

Collections 
Ypsilanti Historical Society, YHS Letter Collection. Letters and drawings (1889–1918).

Publications 

Brown, Flora of Southeastern Polynesia. Bishop Museum Press, Honolulu 1931-35. (3 volumes)

Notes and references

1873 births
1954 deaths
American botanists
People from Ypsilanti, Michigan
University of Michigan alumni
Yale University alumni